Asaphodes periphaea is a moth in the family Geometridae. It is endemic to New Zealand and has only been collected in the mountains near Lake Wakatipu in the South Island.  The male is fuscous coloured sprinkled with whitish colouration. The female is brachypterous. The preferred habitat of this species are alpine bluffs as well as mountainous open country. This species is on the wing from January to March.

Taxonomy 
This species was first described by Edward Meyrick in 1905 using a specimen collected by George Hudson at Humboldt Range, Lake Wakatipu at 4000 ft and named Xanthorhoe periphaea. In 1928 George Hudson discussed and illustrated this species under the name Xanthorhoe periphaea. In 1939 Louis Beethoven Prout placed this species in the genus Larentia. This placement was not accepted by New Zealand taxonomists. In 1971 J. S. Dugdale placed this species within the genus Asaphodes under the name Asaphodes perpheraea. In 1988 J. S. Dugdale confirmed this placement but perpetuated the error in the species name by using Asaphodes perpheraea when discussing this species. The male holotype specimen is held at the Natural History Museum, London.

Description

Meyrick first described this species as follows:
The female of this species is brachypterous and was first collected in January 1987.

Distribution
This species is endemic to New Zealand. A. periphaea has only been collected in the mountains in the north, west and south of Lake Wakatipu. In January 1897 this species as found at Slate Basin and Jane Peak in Otago.

Habitat 
The preferred habitat of this species is alpine bluffs as well as mountainous open country.

Behaviour 
This species is on the wing from January to March.

References 

Moths described in 1905
Moths of New Zealand
Larentiinae
Endemic fauna of New Zealand
Taxa named by Edward Meyrick
Endemic moths of New Zealand